The Silence of Others is an American–Spanish documentary film written and directed by Almudena Carracedo and Robert Bahar which tells the story of the silenced fight of the victims from the dictatorship of Francisco Franco.

Since its release it received several accolades including the Goya Award for Best Documentary, the Platino Award for Best Documentary, two News & Documentary Emmy Awards and was one of the fifteen films shortlisted for the Academy Award for Best Documentary Feature at the 91st Academy Awards.

Production
Filmed over six years, the film follows the survivors of Francisco Franco's dictatorship as they organize the groundbreaking "Argentine Lawsuit" (Querella Argentina) in order to investigate, identify the responsibles and sanction those who committed crimes against humanity during that period.

The film was produced in association with El Deseo by Esther García Rodríguez, Agustín Almodóvar and Pedro Almodóvar and included interviews with survivors and human rights activists such as María Martín López, Ascención Mendieta and Chato Galante, among others.

Release
The film premiered at the 68th Berlin International Film Festival in the Panorama Dokumente section. It was theatrically released in Spain on 16 November 2018. It also aired on La 2 on 4 April 2019 achieving almost a million spectators.

The film was released in United States as a part of American television series POV at PBS.

Reception
Metacritic, which uses a weighted average, assigned the film a score of 73 out of 100 based on 17 critics, indicating "generally favorable reviews".

Stephen Dalton from The Hollywood Reporter wrote about the subject matter of the film that "is still a very necessary story, delivered with rigor and conviction.". Ben Kenigsberg from The New York Times called the film "informative, if not always as specific as it might have been.".

Controversy 
It gives special attention to the exhumation of a mass grave in the Guadalajara cemetery, where they searched for the body of Timoteo Mendieta. The film is based on reinforcing the concept of “victim,” ignoring the political role of those murdered during the war and dictatorship. In the case of the film they hide the role of Mendieta as a trade unionist and the fact that most of the murdered in Guadalajara were workers and 38% of them were unionists. Moreover, there was no justice in that process. It was an exhumation done under a court order for the “transfer of remains” at the request of one of his relatives. This was hardly criticised by other relatives and the Foro por la Memoria. Moreover, in a scene in which the grave is opened, a technician tells Timoteo Mendieta’s daughter, “this is your father”, identifying the body by eye, without even any need for scientific protocol. The scene was a fake; the bones shown in that shot and indicated by the ARMH technician were not only those of Timoteo Mendieta, but he was not even in that grave. His bones were found in another mass grave a year later. Therefore, besides hiding that there was no judicial process besides a “transfer of remains”, it was criticised as it would generate high expectations for other relatives of victims of Francoism. They may believe it is so easy to find their bodies when the number of identifications is low.

Awards and nominations

See also 
 List of Spanish films of 2018

References

External links
 Official site
 

2018 documentary films
2018 films
Spanish documentary films
2010s Spanish-language films
Documentary films about crime
2010s Spanish films
American documentary films
2010s American films